Gorum is an unincorporated community in Natchitoches Parish, Louisiana, United States. Gorum has a post office with ZIP code 71434, which opened on November 21, 1890.

References

Unincorporated communities in Natchitoches Parish, Louisiana
Unincorporated communities in Louisiana